Anthy is a package for an input method editor backend for Unix-like systems for the Japanese language. It can convert Hiragana to Kanji as per the language rules. As a preconversion stage, Latin characters (Romaji) can be used to input Hiragana. Anthy is commonly used with an input method framework such as ibus, fcitx or SCIM.

As of January 2014, ibus-anthy is mature and stable, and can be used to author Japanese documents in LibreOffice version 4.1 by typing Romaji on a U.S. keyboard into a U.S. English localized LibreOffice installation. The Romaji is converted to Hiragana on-the-fly, and the Hiragana is likewise optionally converted to Kanji, with multiple Kanji equivalents presented for selection. The interface is well integrated into LibreOffice.

Anthy is free software released under the GNU GPL v2.

The input method is named after Anthy Himemiya, a character from the anime Revolutionary Girl Utena.

References
The Heke Project, under which Anthy is developed 
WinAnthy, a Windows-Front-End for Anthy

External links
Anthy on osdn.jp

Japanese-language computing
Japanese writing system